La voce senza volto is a 1939 Italian "white-telephones" comedy film directed by Gennaro Righelli. It is part of the tradition of telefoni bianchi comedies, popular in Italy at the time.

Cast
Cast adapted from Riccardo Freda: The Life and Works of a Born Filmmaker.
 Giovanni Manurita as Gino Malversi 
 Vanna Vanni as Mirella Bonardi 
 Elsa De Giorgi as an actress
 Carlo Romano as Maurizio Sala, the tenore 
 Romolo Costa as Riva, the film director
 Claudio Ermelli as Tabarrini 
 Adele Garavaglia as Gino's mother
 Anita Farra as the Hostel owner
 Nietta Zocchi as the actress' maid

Production
La voce senza volto was shot at the Cinecittà Studios. The film features Giovanni Manurita, a popular tenor who had a brief film career. La voce senza volto would be his third last film.

Release
La voce senza volto was distributed theatrically in Italy by Juventus Film on January 5, 1939. Film historian and critic Roberto Curti noted that the current prints of the film in Italy suffer from soundtrack damage, and feature voice work that was re-dubbed onto the film with contemporary dialogue.

References

Bibliography

External links 
 

1939 films
Italian comedy films
1939 comedy films
Films directed by Gennaro Righelli
Italian black-and-white films
Films shot at Cinecittà Studios
1930s Italian films